"Fading Lights" is the twelfth and final song on the album We Can't Dance by Genesis. The song was written by Tony Banks, Phil Collins, and Mike Rutherford, with lyrics by Tony Banks. At ten minutes and sixteen seconds, is the longest song on the album.

The melody of the chorus' first line is reminiscent of that of their earlier track "Ripples" from A Trick of the Tail, and the song has a similar theme of relinquishing the past.

The drum machine loop at the beginning of the song was sampled and used on the song "I Love You...I'll Kill You" by the musical project Enigma on their second album, The Cross of Changes (as they also sampled drums from the same Genesis album the song "Dreaming While You Sleep" for another song of the same album, "The Eyes of Truth").

The song was played live during the band's 1992 The Way We Walk tour. It also appears on their DVD The Way We Walk – Live in Concert.

Versions
During the band's 2007 reunion tour the song was played as they left the stage at the conclusion of their performance. This can be seen on the When In Rome concert DVD.

A remixed version of the song was released on the We Can't Dance album featured in the SACD/DVD re-releases.

The song was included in the band's The Last Domino? Tour as the opening section of a medley with The Cinema Show and Afterglow.

Personnel 
 Tony Banks – keyboards
 Phil Collins – vocals, drums, drum machine 
 Mike Rutherford – electric guitars, bass guitar, bass pedals

References

1991 songs
Genesis (band) songs
Songs written by Tony Banks (musician)
Songs written by Phil Collins
Songs written by Mike Rutherford